The 1977 Tour de France was the 64th edition of the Tour de France, one of cycling's Grand Tours. The Tour began in Fleurance with a prologue individual time trial on 30 June, and Stage 11 occurred on 12 July with a flat stage to Roubaix. The race finished in Paris on 24 July.

Prologue
30 June 1977 – Fleurance to Fleurance,  (ITT)

Stage 1
1 July 1977 – Fleurance to Auch,

Stage 2
2 July 1977 – Auch to Pau,

Stage 3
3 July 1977 – Oloron-Sainte-Marie to Vitoria-Gasteiz,

Stage 4
4 July 1977 – Vitoria-Gasteiz to Seignosse le Penon,

Stage 5a
5 July 1977 – Morcenx to Bordeaux,

Stage 5b
5 July 1977 – Bordeaux to Bordeaux,  (ITT)

Rest day 1
6 July 1977 – Bordeaux

Stage 67 July 1977 – Bordeaux to Limoges, Stage 7a8 July 1977 – Jaunay-Clan to Angers, Stage 7b8 July 1977 – Angers to Angers,  (TTT)The times did not count for the general classification, but riders from the three fastest teams on the stage were awarded bonification seconds.

Stage 89 July 1977 – Angers to Lorient, Stage 910 July 1977 – Lorient to Rennes, Stage 1011 July 1977 – Bagnoles-de-l'Orne to Rouen, Stage 1112 July 1977 – Rouen to Roubaix, '''

References

1977 Tour de France
Tour de France stages